Deniliquin Public School and School Masters Residence is a heritage-listed former school and now museum, arts centre and visitor information centre at George Street, Deniliquin, Edward River Council, New South Wales, Australia. It is also known as the Peppin Heritage Centre. The property is owned by the Edward River Council. It was added to the New South Wales State Heritage Register on 2 April 1999.

History 
In 1857 a school site was chosen close to the Edward River and in 1861 a brick schoolhouse was erected with a frontage to George Street. A survey revealed that only 138 children out of the 613 living in the area attended school.

In 1879 a new school building was built on the site and for one year the old 1861 school became the schoolmaster's residence. As the building was in bad repair, the school principal, David Kennedy refused to live there and in 1880 the old building was demolished a new schoolmaster's residence was constructed in Gothic Revival style.

In 1899 the school was enlarged and in 1905 another room was added. Two more classrooms and a science room were added in 1928.

The school closed in 1972 and was taken over by the Deniliquin Municipal Council, to be used a museum and arts centre managed by a Museum Trust and the George Street Historical Society.

Heritage listing 
Public School & School Masters Residence was listed on the New South Wales State Heritage Register on 2 April 1999.

See also

References

Bibliography

Attribution

External links

New South Wales State Heritage Register
Deniliquin
Museums in New South Wales
Defunct schools in New South Wales
Articles incorporating text from the New South Wales State Heritage Register
Educational institutions established in 1861
1861 establishments in Australia
Educational institutions disestablished in 1972